Dominion VIII is the eighth studio album by Swedish death metal band Grave, released in April 2008.

Track listing
All lyrics were written by Ola Lindgren, except where noted.

Personnel
Grave
Ola Lindgren - Guitars, Vocals
Fredrik Isaksson - Bass
Ronnie Bergerstahl - Drums

Production
Olle Carlsson - Photography
Costin Chioreanu - Artwork
Henrik Jonsson - Mastering
Peter Othberg - Recording (vocals), Mixing, Producer
Matti Kärki - Additional lyrics on "A World In Darkness"
Ola Lindgren - Recording (music), Lyrics
Pepe - Layout, Design

References

External links
Dominion VIII at Discogs

2008 albums
Grave (band) albums
Regain Records albums